Platysoma gracile is a species of clown beetle in the family Histeridae. It is found in North America.

References

 Bousquet, Yves, and Serge Laplante (2006). "Coleoptera Histeridae". The Insects and Arachnids of Canada, part 24, xiii + 485.
 Mazur, Slawomir (1999). "Preliminary studies upon the Platysoma complex (Col. Histeridae)". Annals of Warsaw Agricultural University-SGGW, Forestry and Wood Technology, no. 49, 3-29.

Further reading

 Arnett, R. H. Jr., M. C. Thomas, P. E. Skelley and J. H. Frank. (eds.). (21 June 2002). American Beetles, Volume II: Polyphaga: Scarabaeoidea through Curculionoidea. CRC Press LLC, Boca Raton, Florida .
 
 Richard E. White. (1983). Peterson Field Guides: Beetles. Houghton Mifflin Company.

Histeridae
Beetles described in 1845